Korytów may refer to the following places in Poland:
Korytów, Kłodzko County in Lower Silesian Voivodeship (south-west Poland)
Korytów, Polkowice County in Lower Silesian Voivodeship (south-west Poland)
Korytów, Masovian Voivodeship (east-central Poland)